The men's 400 metres hurdles at the 2000 Summer Olympics as part of the athletics programme were held at Stadium Australia on Sunday 24 September, Monday 25 September and Wednesday 27 September 2000. There were 62 competitors from 45 nations. The event was won by Angelo Taylor of the United States, the nation's fifth consecutive and 17th overall victory in the event. Saudi Arabia and South Africa each earned their first medals in the men's 400 metres hurdles, as Hadi Souan Somayli took silver and Llewellyn Herbert received bronze.

Background

This was the 22nd time the event was held. It had been introduced along with the men's 200 metres hurdles in 1900, with the 200 being dropped after 1904 and the 400 being held through 1908 before being left off the 1912 programme. However, when the Olympics returned in 1920 after World War I, the men's 400 metres hurdles was back and would continue to be contested at every Games thereafter.

Four of the eight finalists from the 1996 Games returned: silver medalist Samuel Matete of Zambia, fifth-place finisher Rohan Robinson of Australia, sixth-place finisher Fabrizio Mori of Italy, and eighth-place finisher Eronilde de Araujo of Brazil. Mori had won the 1999 World Championship, but Angelo Taylor of the United States and Llewellyn Herbert of South Africa were the favorites.

Belarus, Chinese Taipei, Croatia, Cyprus, the Czech Republic, the Dominican Republic, Namibia, Ukraine, and Uzbekistan each made their debut in the event. The United States made its 21st appearance, most of any nation, having missed only the boycotted 1980 Games.

Qualification

Each National Olympic Committee was permitted to enter up to three athletes that had run 49.90 seconds or faster during the qualification period. The maximum number of athletes per nation had been set at 3 since the 1930 Olympic Congress. If an NOC had no athletes that qualified under that standard, one athlete that had run 50.20 seconds or faster could be entered.

Competition format

The competition used the three-round format used every Games since 1908 (except the four-round competition in 1952): quarterfinals, semifinals, and a final. The number of semifinals was expanded from 2 to 3. Ten sets of hurdles were set on the course. The hurdles were 3 feet (91.5 centimetres) tall and were placed 35 metres apart beginning 45 metres from the starting line, resulting in a 40 metres home stretch after the last hurdle. The 400 metres track was standard.

There were 8 quarterfinal heats with 7 or 8 athletes each. The top 2 men in each quarterfinal advanced to the semifinals along with the next fastest 8 overall. The 24 semifinalists were divided into 3 semifinals of 8 athletes each, with the top 2 in each semifinal and the next 2 fastest overall advancing to the 8-man final.

Records

These were the standing world and Olympic records (in seconds) prior to the 1996 Summer Olympics.

No new world or Olympic records were set during the competition.

Schedule

All times are Australian Eastern Standard Time (UTC+10)

Results

All times shown are in seconds.

Quarterfinals

Quarterfinal 1

Quarterfinal 2

Quarterfinal 3

Quarterfinal 4

Quarterfinal 5

Quarterfinal 6

Quarterfinal 7

Quarterfinal 8

Semifinals

Semifinal 1

Semifinal 2

Semifinal 3

Final

Results summary

References

External links
 Official Report of the 2000 Sydney Summer Olympics

Steeple
400 metres hurdles at the Olympics
Men's events at the 2000 Summer Olympics